Asiab-kharabeh (broken watermill), also known as Jolfa Water Mill, is a historic site in East Azerbaijan, Iran with ruins and a waterfall.

The water that flows from this mountain originates from the foothills of the auxiliary mountains (Kiamki) located in Daran village.

History 
Asiyab Kharabeh was a water mill that was used by the people of the region many years ago, but now it is not used due to the destruction of most of it, and for this reason, it is known as the "Asiyab Kharabeh" that means "ruin mill". The height of the mill is 10 meters and the area of its lower area is 200 square meters.

Gallery

References

External links
Photo gallery of the site

Jolfa County
History of East Azerbaijan Province